Mayagadu is a 2011 Indian Telugu-language family drama film directed by Dilip Polan and starring Venu Thottempudi, Charmy Kaur and Satya Krishnan. The film released after much delay.

Cast 
Venu Thottempudi as Leela Krishna
Charmy Kaur as Vandana 
Satya Krishnan as Spandana  
Sayaji Shinde as Chidambaram
Ravi Babu as Ravi
Ali as Vishwanath

Production 
This film marks the return of Venu Thottempudi to the silver screen after a gap of two years. The film reached its post-production stage in mid-2008. The film was delayed and resurfaced in media in late 2010.

Reception 
A critic from The Hindu wrote that the film was "As boring as sitting through a tax seminar". A critic from Filmibeat wrote that "But for the over exposure of glamour of Charmy Kaur the film has nothing more to offer". A critic from Full Hyderabad wrote that "Mayagadu is a stillborn. The movie was clearly released a decade too late, while zillions of movies meanwhile have milked dry the prototype of its plot". A critic from Nowrunning wrote that "Like I mentioned before it was sheer craziness that was thrown on screen. The cast constitutes few brilliant actors, who were not just let down by the script but were made to look as fools in front of the camera".

References